Catalyst Capital Group was in 2014 esteemed the second largest private equity firm in Canada. It was founded in 2002 by Newton Glassman, who was in 2014 its managing partner, and Gabriel de Alba.

History
At some point before 2013, Catalyst hired Jim Riley as COO.

Glassman led the firm from the position of CEO until he stepped down in April 2018 because of medical issues.

In summer of 2017, Catalyst contracted for services with Tamara Global who in turn hired as subcontractors members of Black Cube which "is composed of former members of the Israeli Defence Forces and the Mossad, Israel's national intelligence agency." The  "Court documents also allege that a second company, Psy-Group, whose operatives are also said to be former members of the Mossad or the intelligence branch of the Israeli Defence Forces, was hired to help carry out the operations. Its 'mission priorities', according to an e-mail referenced in the court documents, were to discredit West Face Capital and to '(indirectly) discredit Frank Newbould'", at the time the retired head of the Commercial List of the Ontario Superior Court of Justice.

In August 2019, Callidus was removed from the TSE as its debt mounted. It came to light in August 2019 that two major investors in the firm were the asset-management division of the University of Toronto and the "board of governors' investment committee" of McGill University.

In a January 2021 ruling by Justice Cary Boswell unsealed in the last full week of March 2021, it was revealed that Catalyst hired a dirty tricks squad whose aim was to destroy the pristine good name of Justice Newbould: "'Basically we're trying to prove that he's a racist, a depraved anti-Semite, and trying to find information that could paint him in as negative a light as possible'".

References

Canadian companies established in 2002
Companies formerly listed on the Toronto Stock Exchange
Investment management companies of Canada
Hedge funds
Hedge fund firms in Canada
Financial services companies established in 2002
Private equity firms of Canada
2011 mergers and acquisitions